Heptabarb (INN; Eudan, Medapan, Medomin, Noctyn), also known as heptabarbitone (BAN) or heptabarbital, is a sedative and hypnotic drug of the barbiturate family. It was used in Europe for the treatment of insomnia from the 1950s onwards, but has since been discontinued.

See also 
 Barbiturate

References 

Barbiturates
Hypnotics
Pyrimidines
Sedatives
Cycloalkenes
GABAA receptor positive allosteric modulators